Zach Adams might refer to:

Zach Adams, video game producer, known for Dwarf Fortress
Zach Adams, implicated in the Holly Bobo murder case